Pleasant View Plantation House is located in Oscar, Louisiana.  It was built around 1820 and was added to the National Register of Historic Places on April 5, 1984.

It is Creole in style, one of 193 buildings in Pointe Coupee Parish identified in a study of older buildings.  It is further, however, "one of a  distinct group of eight large Creole plantation houses which, architecturally speaking, represent the apex of the Creole style in  the parish. This can be seen in the following:
 Pleasant View is  a  full  two stories high, unlike the normal one story Creole cottages found in the parish,
It  features brick between posts construction, (The vast majority of the parish's Creole houses have plain frame walls with no  infill.)
It  features pre-Greek Revival details such as turned gallery columns and Adamesque mantels. These details which are associated with the Creole style do not occur often In  the parish. Most of the so-called "Creole" buildings of Pointe Coupee Parish are Creole in plan and configuration only. Typically they feature Greek Revival, Victorian, or bungalow details."

It is located in Oscar on the south side of Louisiana Highway 1, in from the south bank of False River.

References

Creole architecture in Louisiana
Houses on the National Register of Historic Places in Louisiana
Houses completed in 1820
Houses in Pointe Coupee Parish, Louisiana
National Register of Historic Places in Pointe Coupee Parish, Louisiana